Duplicates Glen Dean Limestone; merger required?

The Glen Dean Formation is a geologic formation in Illinois and Kentucky. It preserves fossils dating back to the Carboniferous period.

See also

 List of fossiliferous stratigraphic units in Illinois

References
 

Carboniferous Illinois
Carboniferous southern paleotropical deposits